Gilbertaster is a genus of echinoderms belonging to the family Goniasteridae.

The species of this genus are found in Australia and America.

Species:

Gilbertaster anacanthus 
Gilbertaster caribaea

References

Goniasteridae
Asteroidea genera